"Sex and the Country" is an episode of the BBC sitcom, The Green Green Grass. It was first screened on 14 October 2005, as the sixth episode of series one.

Synopsis

Tyler approaches his English teacher and asks for a date. She declines, saying your education comes first. But this does not stop Tyler buying her a box of make up, which leads to his parents thinking he likes to dress up as a woman. In the end, Tyler makes it clear that it was a present for his teacher, which then heats things up as Marlene wants to give the English teacher what for. Boycie goes to see her instead, and she makes it clear that she is not interested in Tyler, as she only likes older men. She is about to seduce Boycie (thus revealing a weakness in Boycie that was not shown in Only Fools and Horses), when her father Llewellyn stumbles in on the two of them.

Meanwhile, Elgin, Bryan, Jed and Mrs Cakeworthy concoct a potion for Rocky the bull, to make him more attracted to the female sex. Marlene then assumes it would make Boycie more sexually driven if he was to take a sip, so without him knowing she slips some in his coffee – but, what she does not know is that she gave him a different potion, and that Boycie has been drinking the same potion that the cows use to increase the size of their udders.

Episode cast

Production, broadcast and reception
This episode was written by John Sullivan, writer of Only Fools and Horses. The whole of the first series was written entirely by John Sullivan. During its original airing, the episode had a viewing audience of 6.40 million, in the 8:30pm timeslot it was shown. This is the same audiences that sitcoms such as My Family attract. This episode has since been re-run on BBC1, BBC HD and GOLD. The show received one of the highest ratings of the week making it into the top thirty. The UK DVD release was released on 23 October 2006. The release includes the 2005 Christmas Special, a short special entitled 'Grass Roots' and a short documentary on 'Rocky'.

Notes
 This episode marks the fifth in a story arc spanning several series in the form of the gay bull joke.

References

British TV Comedy Guide for The Green Green Grass
BARB viewing figures

2005 British television episodes
The Green Green Grass episodes